Gangodavila East Grama Niladhari Division is a Grama Niladhari Division of the Sri Jayawardanapura Kotte Divisional Secretariat of Colombo District of Western Province, Sri Lanka. It has Grama Niladhari Division Code 526C.

Gangodavila East is surrounded by the Mirihana South, Navinna, Pathiragoda, Udahamulla West, Gangodavila South and Pagoda East Grama Niladhari Divisions.

Demographics

Ethnicity 
The Gangodavila East Grama Niladhari Division has a Sinhalese majority (93.7%). In comparison, the Sri Jayawardanapura Kotte Divisional Secretariat (which contains the Gangodavila East Grama Niladhari Division) has a Sinhalese majority (84.8%)

Religion 
The Gangodavila East Grama Niladhari Division has a Buddhist majority (86.2%). In comparison, the Sri Jayawardanapura Kotte Divisional Secretariat (which contains the Gangodavila East Grama Niladhari Division) has a Buddhist majority (77.1%)

References 

Grama Niladhari Divisions of Kotte Divisional Secretariat